The Otago Central Railway (OCR) or in later years Otago Central Branch Railway, now often referred to as the Taieri Gorge Railway, was a secondary railway line in Central Otago, in the South Island of New Zealand.

Construction
Construction of the OCR began in 1877 and the 27-km section to Hindon was opened in 1889. The line was completed to Middlemarch two years later. The 26 km section of line from Middlemarch to Hyde then opened in 1894. This was followed by the 16 km section from Hyde to Kokonga which opened in 1897. The section to Ranfurly opened in December 1898. The Ranfurly to Wedderburn section opened in 1900 followed by the Wedderburn to Ida Valley section which opened in 1901. The line was opened to Omakau in 1904. Omakau-Chatto Creek opened in July 1906 followed by the line reaching Alexandra in December 1906. The line was opened to Clyde in April 1907. There then followed a delay until the section through the Cromwell Gorge was resumed in 1914. The line reached Cromwell, 236 km, in 1921. The Clyde - Cromwell section (20 km) was closed in 1980 due to construction of the Clyde Dam, a hydro-electric power station in the Cromwell Gorge on the Clutha River. The dam flooded the gorge, through which the line ran, to form Lake Dunstan.

Topography
The branch begins at Wingatui railway station on the Main South Line south of Dunedin. After the branch line closed, the first four kilometres were retained in the national railway network as a service line to local industries. Wingatui Viaduct has been the largest wrought iron structure in New Zealand since it was built in 1887 and is the longest and tallest (47 m) bridge on the line. The railway remains in the Taieri Gorge for 25 km, crossing 16 major bridges with a total length of 1020 m and passing through 10 tunnels with a total length of 1491 m.

Further notable viaducts along the way are Christmas Creek Viaduct, one of the curved viaducts, Deep Stream Viaduct, and Flat Stream Viaduct, also curved.  Just before Hindon station, the railway tracks share a combined road-rail bridge with Hindon Road, a local backroad. After Flat Stream Viaduct, the aptly named "The Notches" section also presented an engineering challenge, accomplished via three short bridges and cuttings through several rocky outcrops. In the second half of the gorge section the line climbs steadily to exit the gorge at Pukerangi (45 km, 254 m altitude) and then descends into the Strath Taieri plateau before reaching Middlemarch at 64 km.

On the remaining line between Wingatui and Middlemarch, passing loops exist at North Taieri and Parera, service sidings at Mt Allen, and both passing loops and sidings at Hindon, Pukerangi and Middlemarch.

Motive power

Steam era
Initially the line was worked by Public Works Department F class tank engines. The Railways Department used R class locomotives until 1895 when 2-8-0 T class tender engines were introduced. They were still in service in 1905. O and P class locomotives were regularly used as were 2-6-2 V class engines. The O class engines were transferred to the North Island between 1898 and 1902. The P class engines were still working the line as late as 1915. The ten UB class locomotives were all allocated to Dunedin and were the mainstay of the line from the 1900s to the 1930s and B and BA class engines were used occasionally. Q class engines worked the line in the 1940s. AB class locomotives were introduced in 1936.

Diesel era
The OCR was one of the first sections of the NZR system to be fully dieselised. The last regular steam-hauled train left Cromwell on 23 February 1968. Two steam excursion trains later conveyed photographers along parts of the line: AB 777 to Ranfurly on 27 October 1968 and AB 693 to Middlemarch on 5 April 1969.

DH class diesel-electric locomotives were introduced on the line in February 1957 running as far as Clyde. They were reclassed as DG in 1968 and were withdrawn by 1983. The DH and DG engines were too heavy to run on the lighter rails of the Cromwell Gorge but the much lighter DJ class diesel locomotives (with 10.3 tonne axle loading) were allowed to run through to Cromwell. With the introduction of these locomotives on 26 February 1968 the remaining AB class steam engines were withdrawn. DI class diesels worked the line from 1978 to 1984 but being fewer in number were seen less often than the DJs, which were the mainstay of the line until its closure in 1990.

Private era
After the line to Middlemarch was taken over by Dunedin Railways (previously Taieri Gorge Railway and originally the Otago Excursion Train Trust) in 1990, their trains have primarily been operated by their fleet of six DJ class locomotives. The leased Silver Fern railcar (RM24) was used on the line, and very rarely, a steam locomotive excursions are operated, usually with an AB class locomotive.

Passenger services and railcars
Passenger services were introduced in 1900 and replaced with mixed trains in 1917, with passenger trains only running during holiday periods. Passenger trains were reinstated in 1936. One of these trains was involved in the Hyde railway disaster of 4 June 1943, which claimed 21 lives and was at the time New Zealand's worst railway disaster (since surpassed only by the Tangiwai disaster). The passenger trains were again replaced with mixed trains in 1951, in turn replaced with Vulcan railcars in 1956. The railcar run was cut back to Alexandra in May 1958 and railcars ceased running on 25 April 1976.

Closure
The line remained open for some time longer than most other branch lines in the South Island, and was used to move construction materials for the Clyde Dam project. With the completion of the dam in 1990, there was little other traffic for the line and the line was closed by the New Zealand Railways Corporation on 30 April 1990. The demolition of the line from Clyde back to Middlemarch commenced on 8 December 1990 and was completed on 5 December 1991. The section from Wingatui on the outskirts of Dunedin and to Middlemarch became a tourist railway, operated by Dunedin Railways. The remainder of the line was lifted and the trackbed developed into the Otago Central Rail Trail.

Stations

 Wingatui (0 km)
 Salisbury (10.4 km) Closed March 1978
 Taioma (12 km) Closed November 1967
 Parera (16.3 km) Closed August 1967
 Mount Allan (21.1 km)
 Christmas Creek (25.3 km) Closed July 1970 
 Hindon (26.8 km)
 Deep Stream (30.9 km) Closed September 1954
 Flat Stream (36.7 km) Opened February 1942, closed September 1954
 The Reefs (42.1 km)
 Pukerangi (45 km)
 Matarae (52 km) Closed March 1985
 Matarae Siding (54 km) Closed December 1960
 Sutton (57.1 km) Closed November 1986
 Middlemarch (63.8 km)
 Ngapuna (70 km) Closed December 1979
 Rock and Pillar (77 km) Closed December 1981
 Hyde (90 km)
 Hyde Township (91.5 km)
 Tiroiti (98 km) Closed April 1974
 Kokonga (106 km) Closed August 1985
 Waipiata (116 km) Closed December 1981
 Ranfurly (123.5 km)
 Wedderburn (137 km)
 Oturehua (149 km)
 Ida Valley (157 km)
 Auripo (161 km)
 Lauder (172 km) Closed April 1985
 Omakau (178.5 km) Closed March 1984
 Chatto Creek (190 km) Closed February 1983
 Galloway (200 km) Closed June 1978
 Alexandra (207 km)
 Clyde (new)(214 km)
 Clyde (old)(216 km)
 Doigs (224 km) Closed March 1970
 Waenga (231 km) Closed March 1970
 Cromwell (236 km)

References

Citations

Bibliography

 (soft-bound);  (hard-bound).
 Hermann, Bruce J; South Island Branch Lines pp 28–30 (1997, New Zealand Railway & Locomotive Society, Wellington)

External links

 Otago Central Rail Trail – official site
 Dunedin Railways – official site

Railway lines in New Zealand
Rail transport in Otago
3 ft 6 in gauge railways in New Zealand
Railway lines opened in 1921
Central Otago District